The 1898 Oregon Agricultural Aggies football team represented Oregon Agricultural College (now known as Oregon State University) as an independent during the 1898 college football season. Playing without a coach, the Aggies compiled a 1–2–1 record and were outscored by their opponents by a combined total of 78 to 36. The Aggies lost to Oregon (0-38). No record is available as to the identity of the team captain.

Schedule

References

Oregon Agricultural
Oregon State Beavers football seasons
Oregon Agricultural Aggies football